Caroline Lalive (born August 10, 1979) is an American former alpine skier who competed in the 1998 Winter Olympics and 2002 Winter Olympics. She was born in Truckee, California.

Lalive married fellow Olympic skier Nelson Carmichael in 2012, and they have one child (born 2015).

References 

1979 births
Living people
American female alpine skiers
Olympic alpine skiers of the United States
Alpine skiers at the 1998 Winter Olympics
Alpine skiers at the 2002 Winter Olympics
21st-century American women